Mark Harris may refer to:

Arts and entertainment
Mark Harris (author) (1922–2007), American novelist known for baseball novels, especially Bang the Drum Slowly
Mark Yale Harris (born 1936), American sculptor
Mark Jonathan Harris (born 1941), American documentary filmmaker
Mark Harris (composer) (born 1955), American musician and composer
Mark Harris (musician) (born 1962), American Contemporary Christian musician
Mark Harris (journalist) (born 1963), American entertainment columnist and magazine editor
Mark Harris (jazz musician) (born 1975), Australian jazz musician and creator/member of band Lah-Lah
Mark Harris, fictional character in the American TV series Man from Atlantis

Politics and law
Mark Harris (Maine politician) (1779–1843), United States Representative from Maine 
Mark Harris (North Carolina politician) (born 1966), American pastor and politician
Mark Harris (Idaho politician), Idaho State Senator since 2015

Sports
Mark Harris (rugby league) (1947–2020), Australian rugby league footballer
Mark Harris (English footballer) (born 1963), English association football player
Mark Harris (rower) (fl. 1970s), British rower
Mark Harris (American football) (born 1970), American professional football player
Mark Harris (softballer) (born 1985), Australian softball player
Mark Harris (Welsh footballer) (born 1998), Welsh international footballer
Mark Harris (bodybuilder) (fl. 2000s), Welsh professional bodybuilder

Others
Mark Harris (programmer), American computer graphics researcher
Mark Harris (publisher), American co-founder of Lumina Media (I-5 Publications), successor company to Fancy Publications (BowTie, Inc.)

See also
Marc Harris, Panamanian accountant
Marcus Harris (disambiguation)